Hoppenville is an unincorporated community located within Marlborough Township, Montgomery County, Pennsylvania. The municipal offices of the township are located in Hoppenville.

References

Unincorporated communities in Montgomery County, Pennsylvania
Unincorporated communities in Pennsylvania